is an English trusts law case, concerning resulting trusts, the presumption of advancement and illegality.

The decision was criticised as "creating capricious results".

Facts
Miss Tinsley sought possession of a house that was solely in her name. Her relationship with her partner, Miss Milligan, had come to an end. Miss Milligan had been living there and had contributed to the purchase price. It had been in Tinsley’s name alone when they bought it, as a way of claiming more in social security. Milligan later repented and confessed to the benefit fraud. Then Tinsley moved out and sought possession of the house, arguing she was solely entitled. Miss Milligan pleaded that it was the common intention that the property should belong to both of them (and so did not need to rely on the illegality).

Judgment
The House of Lords held that because Miss Milligan could invoke the presumption of a resulting trust without relying on the illegal purpose, she did have a share in the house. Miss Tinsley would have to rely on her intention to defraud the social security system to rebut the presumption of a resulting trust and get the property in her own name. Lord Browne-Wilkinson said the following.

Clean hands doctrine
Curiously the House of Lords treated the sole question to be answered as one of illegality in relation to contract. Despite the central plan being to make fraudulent claims for social security payment, none of the judgments considered withholding the equitable remedy on the basis of the clean hands doctrine ("those seeking equity must come with clean hands").

See also

English trusts law

References

English trusts case law
1993 in case law
1993 in British law
House of Lords cases